Frank Leslie Haxell (25 June 1912 – 26 May 1988) was a British trade unionist and communist activist.

Career 
Born in Islington, Haxell worked as an electrician and joined the Electrical Trades Union in 1929.  In 1935, he joined the Communist Party of Great Britain (CPGB).  A prominent and militant activist, he supported an unofficial strike in Chorley, Lancashire, in 1939, and as a result was barred from holding office in the union for five years.

Working with other CPGB members, Haxell was central to successful opposition to a wage freeze during 1950 and 1951, and was elected as assistant general secretary of the union in 1948.  When the general secretary, Walter Stevens, died suddenly in 1954, Haxell stood in the election for the post, defeating Jock Byrne.

Under Haxell's leadership, the union was widely criticised and accused of vote-rigging.  Les Cannon, a CPGB member, was very critical of the Soviet invasion of Hungary, while Haxell was not.  Cannon resigned from the party and worked with Labour Party Members of Parliament John Freeman and Woodrow Wyatt in an attempt to change the leadership of the union.

Haxell was re-elected general secretary in 1959, an election Byrne had widely been expected to win.  Byrne and Frank Chapple took Haxell to court, along with president Frank Foulkes and fourteen other CPGB members, alleging that the election had been fixed.  Byrne and Chapple won the case in 1961, Byrne being declared general secretary by the court.  Haxell was then expelled from the union, and agreed to resign from the CPGB.  Haxell returned to working as an electrician, and was later permitted to rejoin the union, but not to hold office in it.

References

1912 births
1988 deaths
Communist Party of Great Britain members
General Secretaries of the Electrical Trades Union (United Kingdom)
People from the London Borough of Islington